is a former international table tennis player from Japan.

From 1967 to 1975 he won several medals in singles, doubles, and team events in the Asian Table Tennis Championships. He also won a silver medal in the team event at the World Table Tennis Championships in 1965.

References

Japanese male table tennis players
Asian Games medalists in table tennis
Table tennis players at the 1966 Asian Games
Asian Games gold medalists for Japan
Medalists at the 1966 Asian Games
Living people
Year of birth missing (living people)